Park Yi-young (Hangul: 박이영; born 29 June 1994) is a South Korean professional footballer who plays as a right-back for FC St. Pauli II.

Career
Park was going to join a university, but he left for the Philippines after hearing the news that Philippine football clubs were recruiting South Korean based players. In 2013, he joined Team Socceroo, a team of Philippine second division, and contributed to their league title. The next year, he scored five goals and provided six assists during 21 games in the first division. He moved to Pachanga Diliman and participated in friendly games after the league season ended.

In 2015, he was eliminated from tryouts for Marítimo and Teplička nad Váhom, challenging Europe, but succeeded in joining FC St. Pauli. He established himself as the first team's right back in the second half of the 2017–18 season. On 6 May 2018, he scored the crucial winning goal against Arminia Bielefeld which prevented his team's relegation. In August 2018, he agreed a contract extension until June 2022. For the 2020-21 season, he moved on loan to 3. Liga side to Türkgücü München.

Career statistics

Honours
Team Socceroo
UFL Division 2: 2013

References

Living people
1994 births
Footballers from Seoul
Association football fullbacks
Association football midfielders
South Korean footballers
Team Socceroo F.C. players
FC St. Pauli players
FC St. Pauli II players
Türkgücü München players
2. Bundesliga players
3. Liga players
Regionalliga players
South Korean expatriate footballers
South Korean expatriate sportspeople in the Philippines
South Korean expatriate sportspeople in Germany
Expatriate footballers in Germany
Expatriate footballers in the Philippines